Indonesia and Turkey established diplomatic relations in 1950. Diplomatic relations are particularly important because both are Muslim-majority countries as well as modern democracies. Indonesia has an embassy in Ankara and consulate-general in Istanbul. Turkey has an embassy in Jakarta, and honorary consulate in Medan since May 1996. Both countries are full members of the World Trade Organization (WTO), Organisation of Islamic Cooperation (OIC), D-8 Organization for Economic Cooperation, MIKTA and the G-20 major economies.

History

Imperial Period 

Indonesian-Turkish relations can be traced back to the 12th century. Turkish Islamic scholars who visited Indonesia during that period played an important role in the spread of Islam in Indonesia.

Relations with the Ottoman Empire (Turkey's predecessor state) began with the 16th century Ottoman expedition to Aceh, in with the response to the Aceh Sultanate's request for assistance against the Portuguese in Malacca. In the 16th and 17th centuries, beside Aceh Sultanate, the Ottomans also established diplomatic and military ties with the Demak, Mataram, and Ternate Sultanates against European imperialist powers such as Portuguese, Dutch, Spain, and British.

Turkey's relations with the kingdoms in Indonesia (Archipelago) formally began when the then Sultan of Aceh Alauddin Riayat Syah al-Kahhar (1539–1571) sent an envoy to sultan Suleiman the Magnigicent in 1564. Sultan Alauddin wanted to develop this relationship, both for efforts expulsion of colonial powers such as the Portuguese in Malacca, as well as to expand their power in Sumatra.

After the death of Suleiman the Magnificent in 1566, his son Selim II ordered ships to be sent to Aceh. A number of soldiers, gunsmiths and engineers were sent on the Ottoman fleet's expedition to Aceh, along with ample supplies of weapons and ammunition. The first fleet was sent, consisting of 15 ships equipped with artillery. However, the fleet must be diverted to fight the rebellion in Yemen. So only two ships finally arrived in Aceh in 1566–1567, but many other fleets and shipments followed. The first expedition was led by Kurtoğlu Hızır Reis. The Acehnese paid for the shipment in pearls, diamonds and rubies.

The Ottomans taught the Acehnese how to forge their own cannons, some of which reached quite large sizes. The craft of making such weapons had spread throughout the other Southeast Asian kingdoms.

When the Ottomans fought against Russia in 1853, the Sultan of Aceh Alauddin Ibrahim Mansur Syah sent 10,000 Spanish dollars in war aid to the Sultan of Ottoman at that time Abdul Mejid I.

When the Aceh sultanate was attacked by the Dutch in 1873, which sparked the Aceh War, the Aceh sultanate requested protection from a previous agreement with the Ottoman Empire. Once again Aceh asked for military assistance from the Ottoman Empire, but the Ottoman fleet assigned to assist was diverted to Yemen because there was a Zaidi rebellion there.

In 1883, the Ottomans opened a consulate in Batavia, marking the first formal relations on the island of Java.

Modern Era 

Turkey recognized Indonesia on 29 December 1949. This makes Turkey the tenth country to recognize Indonesia's independence and sovereignty. Diplomatic relations were established in 1950. Turkish Embassy in Jakarta was opened on 10 April 1957.

This relationship continued on 24 April 1959, where President Sukarno, the first president of Indonesia had the opportunity to visit Ankara and visit Istanbul for the first time. At that time, President Sukarno was welcomed by Turkish President Celal Bayar. While in Turkey, President Sukarno had the opportunity to visit Anitkabir, Atatürk's mausoleum. In Turkey, he made a speech to Turkish youths and said that Atatürk had been one of the inspirational figures for President Sukarno in formulating the idea of ​​a modern state. According to him, Atatürk played an important role in inspiring the national movement in Indonesia against Dutch imperialism.

Former 3rd Indonesian President Bacharuddin Jusuf Habibie who is also an aviation engineer was invited to Turkey during the reign of Prime Minister Necmettin Erbakan who was also a mechanical engineer. While visiting Turkey, Habibie gave a speech at a stadium in front of Erbakan supporters. Shouts of support and respect emerged from the masses at that time, because at that time Habibie was described as a Muslim figure who had succeeded in building the aircraft industry in the Indonesia, which is part of the Islamic world. Previously, Erbakan and Habibie were also close friends when they both studied mechanical engineering at RWTH Achen University, Germany.

In April 2011, Turkish Prime Minister Abdullah Gül paid a state visit to Indonesia. The welcoming ceremony for PM Abdullah Gül was carried out with a state ceremony held at the Merdeka Palace, April 5, 2011.

During the visit, bilateral talks between the two countries were held. Bilateral talks between President Susilo Bambang Yudhoyono and PM Abdullah Gül focused on follow-up as an effort to increase bilateral cooperation in various sectors. Two countries signed a strategic partnership, with Turkish PM Abdullah Gül declaring that "a new era is beginning with Indonesia."

In 2017, President Joko Widodo paid a state visit to Ankara, Turkey. Indonesia and Turkey signed two agreements during President Joko Widodo's two-day visit to Turkey. The signing ceremony of the healthcare agreement and launching of economic negotiations to establish the Indonesia-Turkey Comprehensive Economic Partnership Agreement (IT-CEPA) witnessed by Jokowi and Turkish President Recep Tayyip Erdoğan.

President Jokowi's visit in 2017 was also to discuss the cooperation between Indonesia and Turkey in the field of strategic industrial development by carrying out joint development, both for the land and air dimensions, as well as other things. Other discussions also covered the issue of counter-terrorism which was the focus of the two countries.

Trade and investment

The total trade between Indonesia and Turkey in 2019 reached US$1.37 billion. Indonesia's exports to Turkey during the same period in 2019 were recorded at US$1.05 billion. Meanwhile, Indonesia's imports from Turkey were recorded at US$321.2 million. Furthermore, bilateral trade between Indonesia and Turkey in 2021 will reach US$2.01 billion, an increase of 51.86% compared to the previous year.

The increase in trade volume between Indonesia and Turkey is also the focus of the governments of the two countries. To increase economic cooperation, the framework of the Indonesia-Turkey Comprehensive Economic Partnership Agreement (IT-CEPA) was created as an effort to secure trade, business collaboration, and increase trade volume between the two countries. The IT-CEPA framework is aimed at increasing the trade volume between Indonesia-Turkey to US$10 billion by the coming years.

With IT-CEPA, the two countries agreed to increase trade in services, by strengthening Garuda Indonesia flight routes to Turkey and Turkish Airlines to Indonesia and the world, as well as encouraging investment in both countries. In this way, more intensive communication is also carried out in the trade sector through trade visits and business dialogues in line with the realization of the IT-CEPA, capacity building by the two countries, as well as product standardization and halal certification.

Currently, there are around 51 Turkish companies operating in Indonesia, and 19 Indonesian companies operating in Turkey. One of the Indonesian products that is quite famous in Turkey is Indomie instant noodles, Indomie products are widely available in Turkish retail stores such as BiM, A101, and Şok. Meanwhile, a Turkish brand that is quite evolve in Indonesia is the Beko home appliance brand. Since its presence in 2018, Beko has continued to expand to various major cities in Indonesia.

After the 2022 G20 meeting in Bali, Turkey's leading bus manufacturer, Karsan together with the company Credo group Schacmindo, an Indonesian company, signed a memorandum of understanding to evaluate production options for bus (semi-assembled) as well as the transformation of electric buses in Indonesia. In terms of the final agreement by the parties, especially in Jakarta, this collaboration is expected to play an important role in the transformation of electric public transport vehicles in important cities in Indonesia. Especially for public transportation in Jakarta, TransJakarta to shift the public transportation fossil fuel based network to minibuses and electric buses by 2030 which is worth one billion dollar with tens of thousands of electric bus fleet vehicles. This also accelerates the realization of IT-CEPA.

Around 2,400 Indonesian citizens reside in Turkey and up to 500 Turkish citizens have a permanent residency in Indonesia.

High-level Visits

Cultural relations and tourism

Cultural

The cultural relations between Indonesia and Turkey can be traced back to the era of the Indonesia archipelago kingdoms. At that time, due to diplomatic contacts and religious similarities, many kingdoms in the Indonesian archipelago adopted the culture, military and Sufism from the Ottomans. The Sultanate of Demak, for example, used military ranks similar to those of Turkey, such as Pasha. In Demak, the title Pasha is used by the Javanese warrior Sentot Ali Basah (Basya/Pasha). The Demak military units also used the names of military regiments that were also used by the Ottomans, such as Bulkio, Turkio, and Arkio. The regiment's name was taken from the names of Bölüki, Oturaki, and the bodyguard regiment of the Ottoman sultan, Janissar Ardia.

Sufism is also a cultural transmission between the Ottoman Empire and the kingdoms in the Indonesia archipelago. One of them is the Sufi dance, this dance is quite popular among the practitioners of Sufism in the kingdoms in Indonesia and even until this country becomes a modern country, the Sufi dance is still practiced by the practitioners of Sufism in Indonesia to this day. If we look at its history, Sufi dance has its roots in Sheikh Jalaluddin Rumi, a Persian sheikh living in Turkey. Several popular qasidahs in Indonesia are also rooted in Turkish culture, popular qasidahs such as Talama Ashku Gharami which is a modification of the Turkish folk song Üsküdara Giderken (Katibim). Modifications of this music are also used as march by the Indonesian paramilitary organization Banser.

In the modern era, the relationship and transmission of Indonesian and Turkish culture has increased again. Especially when the invasion of Turkish drama on Indonesian television. One of them, the Elif series is gaining high popularity among Indonesian audiences, and this drama has even been remake into an Indonesian version. Apart from drama, cultural relations in the field of music are also developing. In 2019, the famous singer from Turkey, Keremcem collaborated with singer from Indonesia, Ayu Ting Ting in one of his singles, "Apalah Cinta".

Tourism
Turkey imposes visa-free for tourists from Indonesia. Indonesian tourists are allowed to stay in Turkey for a maximum of 30 days under this rule. In 2016 the number of Indonesian citizens visiting tourist attractions in Turkey was 47,200 people. It doubled to more than 85,000 people in 2017. Making Indonesia the Southeast Asian country with the most tourists visiting Turkey. Meanwhile, Turkish tourists visiting Indonesia in 2019 reached 23,883 people. This number increased by 14.5% (3,022 people) from the previous year which amounted to 20,861 people.

Disaster relief

Following the 2004 Banda Aceh Tsunami, ties between the two countries strengthened, as Turkey provided extensive humanitarian aid, including building the Gampong Atjeh Istanbul settlement that gave shelter to disaster victims. During the 2011 Van Earthquake, the Indonesian government provided humanitarian aid worth US$1 million to the Turkish government to help earthquake victims in the country. Assistance comes from ready-to-use funds managed by the National Disaster Management Agency (BNPB).

At the time of the 2018 Sulawesi earthquake and tsunami, the Istanbul-based Humanitarian Relief Foundation (IHH) said in a statement that its team rushed to Indonesia immediately after the earthquake occurred and provided emergency assistance to people affected by the disaster in Palu, Dongala and surrounding areas. The aid agency also provided food for 400 people and shelter for 500 people. IHH, which has continued to carry out relief operations in the area since the earthquake hit the island, sent food packages containing rice, cooking oil, flour, canned fish, sauce and sugar to 2,900 earthquake victims.

During the 2020 Aegean Sea earthquake, General Chair of the Indonesian Red Cross and former Vice President Jusuf Kalla said he was ready to send Indonesian Red Cross volunteers to Turkey to help evacuate earthquake victims if needed.  After the earthquake, the Indonesian Islamic organization Muhammadiyah with its volunteer wing collaborated with the Indonesian Student Association in the Bursa and Izmir regions, went directly to the Aşık Veysel Park area, the largest refugee camp to observe and provide moral support and financial assistance to victims affected by the earthquake. For 3 days from Monday, November 2 to Wednesday, November 4, 2020, 20 Indonesian youths attended to help the victims.

When the 2023 Turkey-Syria earthquake hit, Indonesia dispatched humanitarian aid to Turkey from the Halim Perdana Kusuma Airport Base Ops with a Boeing 737 aircraft carrying 62 search and rescue personnel, a combination of 15 personnel from the National Agency for Disaster Countermeasure (BNPB) and 47 personnel from the National Search and Rescue Agency (Basarnas). As well as a Hercules C-130 carrying logistical assistance weighing 5 tons. Additionally, the Indonesian government sent support 120 medical teams to establish a field hospital in Hassa, Hatay Province. Logistical assistance of 40 tons in the form of medical equipment, medicines, tents, electric generators was also sent along with the medical team.

Indonesian government also ordered the lending of the Hercules C-130 transport plane and its crew to help with logistics in Turkey. The aircraft with a carrying capacity of 10 tons will continue to help with logistics transportation in Turkiye until March 2023. Making Indonesia the only country that lends planes for transportation and logistics in Turkey after the earthquake. Further assistance from the Indonesian government departed on 21 February, with four planes carrying 78 tonnes of food, medicine, clothing and logistical equipment to Turkey.

Technology and defense cooperation

In the field of defense industry, in recent years Indonesia and Turkey have cooperated in developing joint defense industries. An example of the result of cooperation in the development of the defense industry from the two countries is the development of the Kaplan medium tank.

Turkish aerospace company, Turkish Aerospace Inc, often cooperates with the Assessment and Application of Technology Research Organization (BPPT) to conduct aerodynamics research. Turkish Aerospace Corporate Marketing and Communication Vice President, Tamer Ozmen said, the cooperation between the two parties had been going on since 2008. The collaboration began when developing the ANKA unmanned aerial vehicle (UAV) program. At that time, Turkish aerospace conducted an ANKA UAV wind tunnel trial at the Indonesian Low Speed ​​Tunnel (ILST) facility belonging to the BPPT Center for Aerodynamics, Aeroelastic and Aeroacoustic Technology (BBTA3). Turkish Aerospace is also collaborating with BBTA3 for the fifth time in testing the payload capacity of the UAV system at ILST to obtain data on the aerodynamic characteristics of the latest drones being developed by Turkish Aerospace, one of which is the Aksungur combat drone.

Turkish rocket and missile manufacturer Roketsan signed a contract with Indonesia in November 2022 to supply Khan missiles and air defense system (Hisar-U/O) for the Indonesian military. This is the first time the Hisar air defence system and Khan missile system (an export version of the battle-proven Bora ballistic missile system) will enter the inventory of forces outside the Turkish military.

See also
Ottoman expedition to Aceh
 List of diplomatic missions of Indonesia
 List of diplomatic missions in Turkey

Notes

External links
Embassy of the Republic of Indonesia in Ankara, Turkey
Turkish Embassy, in Jakarta, Indonesia
Joint Issue: Turkey - Indonesia vs Indonesia - Turkey
Bilateral relations between Indonesia and Turkey

 
Turkey
Bilateral relations of Turkey